John Punch may refer to:
 
John Punch (slave) (fl. 1640), believed to be the first African slave in what would later be the United States
John Punch (theologian) (1603–1661), Irish theologian